Raúl de la Torre (19 February 1938, in Zárate – 19 March 2010, in Buenos Aires) was an Argentine film director screenwriter and film producer.

He was nominated for a Palme d'Or at the 1986 Cannes Film Festival for the film Pobre mariposa.

Filmography as director
 Juan Lamaglia y señora (1970)
 Crónica de una señora (1971)
 Heroine (1972)
 La Revolución (1973)
 Sola (1976)
 El Infierno tan temido (1980)
 Pubis Angelical (1982)
 Pobre mariposa (1986)
 Color escondido (1988)
 Funes, un gran amor (1993)
 Peperina (1995)

References

External links
 

1938 births
2010 deaths
Argentine film directors
Argentine film producers
Argentine screenwriters
Male screenwriters
Argentine male writers
Argentine film score composers
Male film score composers
People from Zárate, Buenos Aires